Welcome to the Jungle is the debut studio album by Franco "El Gorila" released on April 21, 2009 in Puerto Rico and April 28, 2009 in the United States.

Track listing
"Asi Soy" (featuring Yandel) (produced by Nesty and Victor) - 4:19
"Duro" (produced by Tainy, Victor and Marioso) - 2:51
"Pa' Lo Oscuro" (featuring Yaviah, Wisin & Yandel) (produced by Nesty and Victor) - 5:20
"Con Swing" (produced by Nesty and Victor) - 2:50
"Me Estoy Muriendo" (featuring Wisin) (produced by Nesty and Victor) - 4:36
"Que Te Entregues" (produced by Nesty, Victor, Gomez and Marioso) - 3:19
"Sexo Seguro" (featuring Yandel) (produced by RKO, Nesty and Victor) - 3:40
"Psiquiatrica Loca" (produced by Sosa and Monserrrate) - 2:53
"Millonario" (featuring Jayko and Cosculluela) (produced by Nesty and Victor) - 3:17
"Torturame" (produced by Tainy and Victor) - 2:56
"He Querido Quererte" (featuring Tico "El Inmigrante") (produced by Nesty, Victor and Marioso) - 3:29
"Ella Es Agresiva" (featuring Tony Dize) (produced by Montana) - 3:56
"Camila" (produced by Nesty, Victor, Gomez and Marioso) - 4:07
"Vamos A Hacerlo" (featuring Yandel) (produced by Nesty and Victor) - 2:49

Chart performance
The album debuted at #17 on the U.S. Billboard Top Latin Albums and it has so far peaked at #5, making it a success.

References

Reggaeton albums
2009 debut albums
Machete Music albums